"Situation Critical" is a 1985 song by Canadian band Platinum Blonde from their album Alien Shores. The song reached number 8 on the Canadian chart in 1985 making it their second top 10 hit in Canada after "Crying Over You". The song plays at 122 BPM in 4/4 time signature, and is in C# minor. Lead singer Mark Holmes was interviewed by radio station BOOM 97.3 about the song. It was also the opening track for the album.

Music video
The music video features a car pulling up and a woman taking photos with her camera, while the band performs the song on a stage, and was directed by Champagne Pictures.

Charts

References

1985 singles
1985 songs
Platinum Blonde (band) songs
CBS Records singles